The subfamily Cynopterinae ("flying dogs") comprises 24 species of pteropodid bats distributed exclusively in South and Southeast Asia.

The subfamily contains the following genera:

 Aethalops – pygmy fruit bats
 Alionycteris
 Balionycteris
 Chironax
 Cynopterus – dog-faced fruit bats, flying dogs or short-nosed fruit bats
 Dyacopterus – Dayak fruit bats
 Haplonycteris
 Latidens
 Megaerops
 Otopteropus
 Penthetor
 Ptenochirus – musky fruit bats
 Sphaerias
 Thoopterus - flying Jackal

References 

Bats
Megabats
Mammal subfamilies